María José is a Mexican telenovela writing by Arturo Moya Grau in 1978.

Is an adaptation of the Chilean telenovela María José produced in 1975 by Canal 13.

Cast 
Fanny Cano as María José
Fernando Luján as El Jaiba
Leonardo Daniel as Alfredo 
Gregorio Casals as Pablo 
Blanca Sánchez as Nadia
Antonio Medellín
Víctor Junco
Maria Eugenia Avendaño
Virginia González
Sonia Esquivel
Susana Dosamantes

References

External links 

Mexican telenovelas
1978 telenovelas
Televisa telenovelas
1978 Mexican television series debuts
1978 Mexican television series endings
Mexican television series based on Chilean television series
Spanish-language telenovelas